General elections were held in Senegal on 26 February 1978 to elect a President and National Assembly. Following a constitutional amendment in 1976, the elections were open to more than one party for the first time since 1963. President Léopold Sédar Senghor of the Socialist Party (formerly the Senegalese Progressive Union) was challenged by Abdoulaye Wade of the Senegalese Democratic Party, but won with 82% of the vote. Members of the National Assembly were elected by closed-list proportional representation. In the National Assembly election, the Socialist Party won 82 of the 100 seats. Voter turnout was 63.5% in the presidential election and 62.6% in the parliamentary election.

Results

President

National Assembly

References

Further reading

Senegal
Elections in Senegal
1978 in Senegal
Presidential elections in Senegal